Yuji Funayama (born July 13, 1992) is a Japanese professional basketball player who plays for Rizing Zephyr Fukuoka of the B.League in Japan. He was selected by the Tokyo Cinq Reves with the 12th overall pick in the 2015 bj League draft.

Career statistics

Regular season 

|-
| align="left" | 2015-16
| align="left" | Hiroshima L
|37 ||27 || 25.8 ||.368  || .280 ||.333 || 4.6 ||.6 || .7 ||.4  || 4.1
|-
| align="left" | 2017-18
| align="left" | Akita
|29 ||4 || 7.2 ||.219  || .150 ||.667 || .8 || .4 || .3 ||.1  ||.7
|-
| align="left" | 2018-19
| align="left" | Aomori
|16 ||1 || 7.57 ||.429  || .182 ||.333 || 1.4 || .4 || .38 ||.06  ||1.7
|-
| align="left" | 2018-19
| align="left" | Nara
|7 ||0 || 4.09 ||.333  || .000 ||.500 || .9 || .1 || .14 ||.00  ||1.1
|-
| align="left" | 2019-20
| align="left" | Nara
|15 || || 6.7 ||.500  || .500 ||.000 || .8 || .1 || .3 ||.1  ||.6
|-

Playoffs 

|-
|style="text-align:left;"|2017-18
|style="text-align:left;"|Akita
| 1 || 0 || 1.16 || .000 || .000 || .000 || 0 || 0 || 0 || 0 ||0
|-

Early cup games 

|-
|style="text-align:left;"|2018
|style="text-align:left;"|Aomori
|1 || 0 || 0.10 || .000 || .000 || .000 || 1.0 || 0.5 || 0.0 || 0 || 0
|-
|style="text-align:left;"|2019
|style="text-align:left;"|Nara
|2 || 0 || 1:51 || .000 || .000 || .000 || 0.0 || 0.0 || 0.0 || 0 || 0
|-

References

1992 births
Living people
Akita Northern Happinets players
Aomori Wat's players
Bambitious Nara players
Hiroshima Lightning players
Japanese men's basketball players
Sportspeople from Nara Prefecture
Tokyo Cinq Rêves players
Power forwards (basketball)